Eerde is a hamlet in the province of Overijssel in the Netherlands.

At the heart of the Eerde hamlet lies Eerde castle, a castle in the Dutch-classical style from 1715, surrounded by a  estate in the Baroque style managed by the Natuurmonumenten foundation since 1965.

The first castle on this site was built in the 14th century, but was soon destroyed by the forces of the Archbishop of Utrecht in 1380. The Van Twickelo, Van Renesse, and Van Pallandt families have lived in castles on this site since.

In the early 1920s, baron Philip van Pallandt deeded the castle and surrounding land to the Order of the Star in the East, an organization connected to the famous philosopher and spiritual teacher Jiddu Krishnamurti, of whom the baron was an avid follower. The Order held annual gatherings of its members in the castle grounds until its dissolution in 1929; the deed to the estate was officially transferred back to the van Pallandt family in 1931, however Krishnamurti continued to occasionally use the estate for lectures and meetings until the outbreak of World War II. During the war the estate had been used as a concentration camp (Camp Erika) by the occupying German forces, and afterwards Krishnamurti felt this precluded its use as a proper meeting space.

In 1934, the castle was turned into a school for Jewish children threatened by the Nazi regime. This school, founded by the Quakers, had to be closed under pressure from the German occupiers in 1943. This boarding school was known as The International Quaker School Eerde. 

After World War II in the castle a new boarding school was founded which is now known as International School Eerde, and it now offers IGCSEs and IB programmes to its students. Since the mid-fifties this school has no longer been run by the Quakers.

References

Populated places in Overijssel
Ommen